Gerard Osorio (born March 29, 1993) is a Spanish male volleyball player. He is part of the Spain men's national volleyball team.

References

External links
 Profile at FIVB.org

1993 births
Living people
Spanish men's volleyball players
Sportspeople from the Province of Barcelona
People from Sant Cugat del Vallès
Opposite hitters
Expatriate volleyball players in France
Spanish expatriate sportspeople in France